The EXtreme PREcision Spectrograph (EXPRES) is an optical fiber fed echelle instrument designed and built at the Yale Exoplanet Laboratory to be installed on the 4.3-meter Lowell Discovery Telescope operated by Lowell Observatory. It has a goal to achieve 10 cm/s radial velocity precision. It uses a laser frequency comb to calibrate the primary wavelength for EXPRES.

See also 
 ESPRESSO spectrograph
 HARPS3

References 

Astronomical instruments
Telescope instruments
Exoplanet search projects
Spectrographs